Halifax West was a provincial electoral district in Nova Scotia, Canada, that elected one member to the Nova Scotia House of Assembly. It was formed in 1933 when Halifax County was divided into five distinct electoral districts.  In 1955, the district of Halifax Northwest was created from a portion of Halifax West. Following a name change in 1966 to Halifax County West, the district was redistributed entirely to create the current district of Halifax-St. Margaret's in 1967.

Members of the Legislative Assembly 
Halifax West elected the following members to the Legislative Assembly.

Election results

1933 general election

1937 general election

1941 general election

1945 general election

1949 general election

1953 general election

1956 general election

1960 general election

1963 general election

References

Former provincial electoral districts of Nova Scotia